Johan Cornelius Tuxen (12 May 1820 – 29 January 1883) was a Danish naval officer, politician, editor and writer. He was a member of the Folketing from 1864 to 1879.

Early life
Tuxen was born in Copenhagen, the son of first lieutenant and later captain commander Peter M. Tuxen (1783–1838) and Elisabeth M. Simonsen (1786–1867).

Naval career
Tuxen became a cadet in 1834 and a second lieutenant with Gerner's Medal in 1840. In 1840–1841, he served aboard the brig Aliart in the Danish West Indies. The ship grounded at Puerto Rico and he later received a sentence for dereliction of duties at the from the Generalkrigsretten. In 1843–1844, he served aboard the brig Ørnen on an expedition to South America. In 1845, he was decommissioned from service to command the civilian steamer Frederik VI in domestic waters.

He also studied mathematics, navigation, natural sciences and history. From 1848 to 1867, he served as a teacher in mathematics and navigation at the Naval Cadet Academy.

During the First Schleswig War, in 1849, now with the rank of first lieutenant, he served aboard the corvette Diana. He later served on a naval training ship. He reached the rank of lieutenant in 1858 and captain lieutenant in 1861.

During the Second Schleswig War, in 1864, he was commander of the schooner Diana in the North Sea. He reached the rank of captain in 1868. In 1871, he commanded the schooner Fylla in an expedition to Iceland and the Faroe Islands. In 1875, he was decommissioned from the Navy with the rank of commander due to poor health.

Politics
From 1864 to 1879, Tuxen was a member of the Folketinget. He was elected in Copenhagen's 9th Constituency and represented Højre. In 1866–1867, he was also a member of the Copenhagen City Council, and from 1867 to 1883 a member of the Port Council. From 1872 to 1881, he was a member of Frederiksberg Municipal Council.

Other occupations
He was a board member from 1849 and its president from 1858 to 1879.

Tuxen was also a prolific writer. Together with his brother, Georg Emil Tuxen, he also published a text book in Navigation (1856).

Personal life
Tuxen married twice. His first wife was Wilhelmine Augusta Tegner (1822–1848), daughter of merchant and lieutenant Martin Peter Tegner (1796–1825) and Johanne Cecilie Cathrine Christophersen (1802–1875). They were married on 17 April 1847 in the Church of Holmen in Copenhagen. His second wife was Elise Rosalie Christence Bernhoft (1827–1895), a daughter of bureau chief Hans Lassenius B. (1793–1851) and  Hermine Andrea Bentzen (1799–1874). They were married on 2 April 1853 in Kristiania. Tuxen died on 29 January 1883 and is buried in the Cemetery of Holmen. He was survived by the following children:
 August Martin Julius Tuxen (1848–1911), surveyor in Australia
 Jean Charles Tuxen (1854–1927), Director of the Royal Naval Dockyards, chamberlain
 Hans Lassenius Herman Tuxen (1856–1910), Lieutenant Colonel, Director of the Army Technical Corps
 Peter Vilhelm Tuxen (1857–1913), surveyor in Australia
 Vigand Knud Tuxen (1859–1902), engineer in Northern Norway
 Marie Benedicte Tuxen (1860–1952). owner of Tybjerggaard
 Johan Edvin Tuxen (1862–1864)
 Ludvig Christian Tuxen (1864–1918), surveyor in Australia
 Alexander Holst Tuxen (1865–1907), engineer
 Theodor Tuxen (1867–1867)
 Johanne Elise Tuxen (1868–1935), hospital manager
 Eivin Theodor Tuxen (1870–1913), master mason in Australia
 Hermine Andrea Bernhoft Tuxen (1873–1933), music teacher

Honors
 1856: Order of the Dannebrog
 1865: Dannebrogsmand
1879: Commander of the Order of the Dannebrog

References

External links

Johan Cornelius Tuxen at geni.com

19th-century Danish naval officers
19th-century Copenhagen City Council members
Danish writers
Royal Danish Naval Academy alumni
Academic staff of Royal Danish Naval Academy
Recipients of the Henrik Gerner Medal
Commanders Second Class of the Order of the Dannebrog
1820 births
1883 deaths
Tuxen family